Roy Dowsing (23 October 1915 – 13 December 1973) was an Australian rules footballer who played with Melbourne in the Victorian Football League (VFL). His football career lasted from 1939-1946.

Career
Roy Dowsing played for Melbourne Football Club throughout his career. Dowsing's debut game was Round 14 in 1939 against St Kilda Football Club at Junction Oval. He scored the first goal of the match, leading Melbourne to win by 24 points. His last game was Round 18 in 1946 against Fitzroy Football Club at Brunswick Street Oval.

Notes

External links 

1915 births
1973 deaths
Australian rules footballers from Victoria (Australia)
Melbourne Football Club players